Bob Bryan and Samantha Stosur were the defending champions but lost in the quarterfinals to Mark Knowles and Anna-Lena Grönefeld.

Knowles and Grönefeld defeated Leander Paes and Cara Black in the final, 7–5, 6–3 to win the mixed doubles tennis title at the 2009 Wimbledon Championships.

Seeds
All seeds received a bye into the second round. 

  Leander Paes /  Cara Black (final)
  Bob Bryan /  Samantha Stosur (quarterfinals)
  Marcin Matkowski /  Lisa Raymond (third round)
  Kevin Ullyett /  Hsieh Su-wei (quarterfinals)
  Daniel Nestor /  Elena Vesnina (third round)
  Mike Bryan /  Bethanie Mattek-Sands (third round)
  Robert Lindstedt /  Rennae Stubbs (third round)
  Max Mirnyi /  Nadia Petrova (third round)
  Mark Knowles /  Anna-Lena Grönefeld (champions)
  Nenad Zimonjić /  Yan Zi (second round)
  André Sá  /  Ai Sugiyama (quarterfinals)
  Stephen Huss /  Virginia Ruano Pascual (semifinals)
  Mahesh Bhupathi /  Sania Mirza (third round)
  Marcelo Melo /  Peng Shuai (second round)
  Lukáš Dlouhý /  Iveta Benešová (quarterfinals)
  Christopher Kas /  Chuang Chia-jung (third round)

Draw

Finals

Top half

Section 1

Section 2

Bottom half

Section 3

Section 4

References

External links

2009 Wimbledon Championships on WTAtennis.com
2009 Wimbledon Championships – Doubles draws and results at the International Tennis Federation

X=Mixed Doubles
Wimbledon Championship by year – Mixed doubles